Washington Township is one of fourteen townships in Dearborn County, Indiana. As of the 2010 census, its population was 1,431 and it contained 574 housing units.

History
Washington Township was established in 1852.

Geography

Major highways
  U.S. Route 50

Cemeteries
The township contains one cemetery, Mount Tabor Church.

Education
Washington Township residents may obtain a library card at the Aurora Public Library in Aurora.

References
 United States Census Bureau cartographic boundary files
 U.S. Board on Geographic Names

External links
 Indiana Township Association
 United Township Association of Indiana

Townships in Dearborn County, Indiana
Townships in Indiana
1852 establishments in Indiana
Populated places established in 1852